Lloyd Valdemar "Skippy" Baxter (December 6, 1919 – December 18, 2012) was an American figure skater.  Born in Saskatchewan, Canada, his family moved to Oakland, California when he was 1 year of age. Skippy started his skating career as a speed skater. Often winning awards as a youth Speed skater in Oakland, California. Then later, he won two medals at the 1940 United States Figure Skating Championships: a bronze in men's singles and a silver in pair skating with Hedy Stenuf.  Baxter went on to skate professionally with the Ice Capades, working with Sonja Henie in her shows.

Skippy and his brother Meryl Baxter owned an ice rink in Santa Rosa, California on Summerfield Road, where the famous cartoonist Charles Schulz would take his family for skating lessons. It was there that Charles and Skippy Baxter formed a close friendship that lasted until the death of Charles Schulz.  Baxter choreographed a segment for the 1969 animated film A Boy Named Charlie Brown, in which Snoopy skates.

He later coached figure skating in Northern California at the Redwood Empire Ice Arena in Santa Rosa, California.  Charles Schulz built the rink while Skippy and his brother Meryl Baxter helped run and operate the rink. Skippy was inducted into the United States Figure Skating Hall of Fame in 2003.

Results
(men's singles)

(pairs with Stenuf)

Early life
Lloyd Baxter, having endured an accident as a youth with a tractor, which almost resulted in a leg amputation, began skating at the urging of his mother to strengthen his leg to avoid amputation. In turn, began his career as a champion youth speed skater.

Baxter enlisted in the United States army in 1943 and served in Northern Italy during World War II with the 10th Mountain Division, along with his brother Meryl Baxter. They were granted leave on weekends to continue performing in Ice Shows. Baxter was on the United States Olympic Figure Skating team, but because of the war and his enlistment, the Winter Olympics were cancelled that year.

References 

2012 deaths
1919 births
American male single skaters
American male pair skaters
Sportspeople from Saskatchewan
Sportspeople from Oakland, California
United States Army personnel of World War II
United States Army soldiers